Lakhi Jungle is a village in the district of Bathinda in Punjab, India. It is situated 15 km from the city of Bathinda (near Goniana), on the way to Muktsar. In the 17th century, the Sikhs used the surrounding jungle (from which the village takes its name) as a hideout from persecution by the Mughal Empire and the Duranni Empire. The jungle itself has mostly been deforested. The ninth Sikh Guru, Guru Teg Bahadur and tenth Sikh Guru, Guru Gobind Singh visited this place. The historic Gurdwara Lakhi Jungle Sahib is located on the outskirts of the village.

References 

Bathinda